Halbe (Lower Sorbian Łobje) is a municipality in the Dahme-Spreewald district of Brandenburg, Germany. It is situated near the capital city Berlin and the Spreewald.
Four other villages are part of Halbe: Briesen/Brand with the Tropical Islands resorts of Dom, Teurow, Freidorf and Oderin. Halbe was the site of the Battle of Halbe during the final days of the Second World War.

Demography

See also
The Battle of Halbe, which was fought in the last days of the Second World War.
The Kaiserbahnhof Halbe, which was built for Kaiser Wilhelm I

References

Localities in Dahme-Spreewald
Teltow (region)